The men's long jump event at the 2011 Military World Games was held on 20 and 22 July at the Estádio Olímpico João Havelange.

Records
Prior to this competition, the existing world and CISM record were as follows:

Schedule

Medalists

Results

Qualification

Final

References

long jump